Hermine E. Ricketts, also known as Hermine Ricketts-Carroll (1956–2019), was a Jamaican-born American architect, activist, and painter. She was active as an architect in South Florida, where she was the only Black female architect in 1992. She and her husband made national news when they had a six year-long legal battle with the Village Council of Miami Shores to keep a vegetable garden in their front yard, a lawsuit which she won in July 2019 and she died soon after.

Biography 
Hermine E. Ricketts was born in 1956 in Hermitage, Saint Andrew Parish, Jamaica. She attended Howard University in Washington, D.C..

Ricketts was the founder president in 1986 of HER Architects, Inc., located in Coral Gables, Florida. Her architecture work was acknowledged in The New York Times, and Ebony magazine, where she was named a "top women architect" in the 1990s. In 1992, Ricketts was the only Black female architect in South Florida. Her work included the renovation of the Jackson Memorial Hospital, and a renovation of a Veterans Hospital. Within the Miami-Dade County Public Schools, she designed alongside the Broward firm the Miami Shores Elementary School and Comstock Elementary School; and designed alone the Carol City Elementary School and Jann Mann Opportunity Education. She also designed African Square Park in Meyga Learning Center at 1466 NW 62nd Street in Miami.

In 2004, Ricketts paintings were included in a group exhibition "Three Women" at the gallery at the African Heritage Cultural Arts Center, 6161 NW 22nd Avenue, Miami. 

She and her husband Tom Carroll had a six year-long legal battle with the Village Council of Miami Shores in order to change zoning, so she could maintain keeping her vegetable garden in their front yard. Starting in 2013, the village of Miami Shores has banned growing vegetable gardens in front yards, which became punishable by a daily fine of US $50 because they were "unsightly and violated zoning codes". For 20 years, Ricketts had maintained a vegetable garden in her front yard. Her case was supported by the Institute for Justice. While the legal battle was coming to an end and they had won their case, Ricketts died on August 24, 2019 after struggle with illness.

Work 

 Veterans Hospital
 Jackson Memorial Hospital renovation, 1611 NW 12th Avenue, Miami, Florida
 Miami Shores Elementary School, with Broward firm, 10351 NE 5th Avenue, Miami Shores, Florida
 Comstock Elementary School, with Broward firm, 2420 NW 18th Avenue, Miami, Florida
 Carol City Elementary School, Miami Gardens, Florida
 Phyllis Ruth Miller Elementary School, 840 NE 87th Street, Miami, Florida
 Jann Mann Opportunity Education, 16101 NW 44th Court, Opa-locka, Florida
 African Square Park in Meyga Learning Center, 1466 NW 62nd Street, Miami, Florida

See also 
 African-American architects

References 

1956 births
2019 deaths
African-American architects
Jamaican emigrants to the United States
African-American activists
African-American painters
Howard University alumni
People from Coral Gables, Florida
People from Miami Shores, Florida
20th-century American architects
American gardeners
Architects from Florida